Roland Altenburger (born 22 September 1948) is a Swiss rower. He competed in the men's coxless four event at the 1968 Summer Olympics.

References

1948 births
Living people
Swiss male rowers
Olympic rowers of Switzerland
Rowers at the 1968 Summer Olympics
People from Schaffhausen
Sportspeople from the canton of Schaffhausen
20th-century Swiss people